Qionghai, or in local Hainanese dialect as Kheng Hai, is one of the seven county-level cities of Hainan province, China. Although called a "city", Qionghai refers to a large land area in Hainan - an area which was once a county. Within this area is the main city, Qionghai City. It is located in the east of the island at the mouth of the Wanquan River,  from the provincial capital of Haikou.

The seat of government is at Jiaji, locally referred to as Kachek city. Bo'ao, seat of the Boao Forum for Asia, belongs to Qionghai.

The former counties of Qiongdong (postal: Kiungtung) and Lehui (樂㑹, postal: Lokwei) are now part of Qionghai City.

Climate
Qionghai has a tropical monsoon climate (Köppen Am). Monsoonal influences are strong, with a relatively lengthy wet season and a pronounced dry season (January to March). Humidity is consistently very high, with an average relative humidity of 85.8%. With monthly percent possible sunshine ranging from 31% in February to 62% in July, the city receives 2,037 hours of bright sunshine annually; the city receives about only a third of possible sunshine from December thru February, while May thru July is the sunniest time of year.

Administrative divisions
Qionghai is divided into 12 towns:

Other

The most famous dish of Qionghai is called Kazek Duck.

Qionghai is served by Qionghai Bo'ao Airport.

Notable people 
 Lee Chiaw Meng, served in Prime minister Lee Kuan Yew's cabinet as Minister of Education, Minister of Science and Technology and Member of Parliament.
 Patrick Lee, Billionaire Business entrepreneur magnate and the founder of Lee & Man Paper.
 Pang Chin Hin (冯振轩), entrepreneur, chairman and founder of the well-known food manufacturing company Mamee Double-Decker (M) Sdn Bhd.
 Pang Lim (庞琳), entrepreneur and community figure who founded and currently chairs the Koufu Group Ltd, an F&B establishment operators.
 Wee Meng Chee, rapper, singer-songwriter and filmmaker.

See also
 List of administrative divisions of Hainan

References

External links

 Official website (Chinese)

 
Qionghai